The following list encompasses notable smart TV platforms and application software that are used as software framework and middleware platforms used by more than just one manufacturer.

Smart TV middleware providers to multiple third parties
For TV sets and companion boxes vendors, available under OEM license.

Smart TV framework platforms managed by standardization bodies or technology consortium

Smart TV framework platforms managed by single companies or foundations

Smart TV platforms utilized by vendors
Includes first and third-party solutions.

See also

Smart TV
Digital media player
Home theater PC
Comparison of set-top boxes
Comparison of digital media players
 Next Generation Broadcasting Network TVOS, a Chinese-only operating system announced in December 2008

References

Digital television lists
Middleware
Digital media players
Media players
Consumer electronics
Internet of things
Information appliances
Computing-related lists
Film and video technology
.
Internet broadcasting
.
Multimedia
Networking hardware
Streaming media systems
.
Television technology
Television terminology
Technological comparisons